Charles Edwards Lester or C. Edwards Lester (1815–1890) was an American author and diplomat.

Lester was born in Griswold, Connecticut, a descendant of Jonathan Edwards.  He was of a roving disposition and traveled widely in the United States and Europe.  He was admitted to the bar in Mississippi and later was ordained a minister in the Presbyterian church.

In 1840, he addressed antislavery meetings in Massachusetts and was elected a delegate to the London antislavery conference of that year.  He remained in England after the close of the conference.  His The Glory and Shame of England, published in New York in 1841, criticized England's antislavery professions.  In 1842, President Tyler appointed Lester United States Consul at Genoa.

Books
 The Life of Vespucius (1845; new edition, 1905)
 The Artist, The Merchant, and the Statesman of the age of the Medici and of Our own Times (two volumes, 1845)
 My Consulship (two volumes, 1851)
 The Napoleon Dynasty (1852)
 The Life of Sam Houston (1855)
 Passages from the History of the United States (1866)
 ‘’Our First Hundred Years’’ (1874)
 America's Advancement, or the Progress of the United States during their First Century (1875)
 The Mexican Republic (1878)
 a Life of Charles Sumner (1874)
 Life and character of Peter Cooper (1883)

Gallery

References

 

19th-century American historians
19th-century American male writers
American biographers
People from Griswold, Connecticut
1815 births
1890 deaths
19th-century American lawyers
American male non-fiction writers